James Lenox Naper  (5 December 1825 — 4 December 1901) was an Anglo-Irish first-class cricketer, British Army officer and farmer.

The son of the politician James Lenox William Naper, he was born in December 1825 at Wellesbourne, Warwickshire. He was educated at Eton College, before going up to Christ Church, Oxford. Naper played first-class cricket for the Marylebone Cricket Club (MCC) against Oxford University at Oxford in 1846. Batting twice in the match, he was dismissed in the MCC's first innings for 14 runs by William Davies, while in their second innings he was dismissed for 2 runs by Stephen Soames. He was appointed High Sheriff of Meath in January 1853 and later served as Deputy Lieutenant for the county in 1870. He was additionally a justice of the peace for Meath. Naper served in the British Army with the Royal Meath Militia, being commissioned as a major in December 1854. Naper was a prominent figure in Irish agriculture, breeding prized Hereford cattle and Shropshire sheep. He died suddenly at Dublin in December 1901.

References

External links

1825 births
1901 deaths
People from Stratford-on-Avon District
People educated at Eton College
Alumni of Christ Church, Oxford
English cricketers
Irish cricketers
Marylebone Cricket Club cricketers
High Sheriffs of Meath
Deputy Lieutenants of Meath
English justices of the peace
Irish justices of the peace
English farmers
Irish farmers